Christine Helen Middlemiss  is a Scottish veterinary surgeon and the Chief Veterinary Officer of the United Kingdom.

Early life
She was born in Montrose and attended primary school in Morayshire.

Career

She graduated from Glasgow Vet School in 1992, then began her veterinary career as a mixed practitioner in Biggar, Lanarkshire. This was followed by a spell at the Royal (Dick) Veterinary School, then a return to mixed practice for several years in Northern England
She joined the Animal Health Agency in 2008.

She became Deputy Director for Animal Traceability and Public Health in 2016.

Chief Veterinary Officer
She became Chief Veterinary Officer  on the 1st of March 2018.

Middlemiss was awarded a visiting professorship  by Harper Adams University in 2019.

She was appointed Companion of the Order of the Bath (CB) in the 2023 New Year Honours for services to the veterinary and farming sectors.

Personal life
She lives in Edinburgh and has a rescue cat.

See also
 Veterinary medicine

References

External links
Biography

1969 births
Living people
People from East Lothian
People from Montrose, Angus
Scottish veterinarians
Women veterinarians
21st-century Scottish scientists
21st-century British women scientists
Companions of the Order of the Bath